KARA Best 2007-2010 is the first Japanese greatest hits album by the South Korean girl group Kara. It was released on September 29, 2010 in Japan in 2 editions: CD+DVD and CD only.

Background
The album contain all singles from 2007 to 2010 and some songs from their albums Rock U, Pretty Girl, Revolution and Lupin. On October 1, 2010, it was announced on their official Japanese website on that the album will include a bonus. The group gave photographs to the applicants to show their gratitude. Among those applicants, 10 were chosen via lottery to attend a meet & greet session on October 15, 2010.

Chart performance 
The album debuted at number two on the Oricon Daily Chart selling 18,223 copies. This marked the best achievement by a South Korean girl group for a full album in Japan at that time. On October 5, 2010, the album ranked number-two on the Oricon Weekly Chart selling over 51,000 copies, making it the first South Korean girl group album to enter Top 10 on Oricon.

The album was certified Gold by RIAJ, making it the first all-Korean album from a South Korean group since the 90s to break the 100,000 copies barrier in Japan. The album was also the most downloaded album in Japan's iTunes Store Pop. The album exceeded the ranking of Iconiq's Change Myself, Justin Bieber's My World, and Kesha's Animal to become the highest ranked album among newcomers in 2010.

Track listing

Charts

Year-end charts

Certifications

Sources 

2010 greatest hits albums
Dance-pop compilation albums
Kara (South Korean group) albums
Universal Records compilation albums